John McEnroe was the defending champion but did not compete that year.

Brad Gilbert won in the final 6–2, 6–2 against Eliot Teltscher.

Seeds

  Mats Wilander (first round)
  Tim Mayotte (second round)
  Brad Gilbert (champion)
  David Pate (semifinals)
  Johan Kriek (quarterfinals)
  Kevin Curren (quarterfinals)
  Eliot Teltscher (final)
  Jay Berger (first round)

Draw

Finals

Top half

Bottom half

External links
 Main draw

Singles